Carlos Alberto Trejo Sánchez (born March 20, 1983) is a Mexican former professional football goalkeeper who last played for Chiapas.

References 

1983 births
Living people
San Luis F.C. players
Club Necaxa footballers
Liga MX players
Association football goalkeepers
Footballers from Mexico City
Mexican footballers